was a Japanese sprinter. She competed in the women's 4 × 100 metres relay at the 1932 Summer Olympics.

References

External links
 

1913 births
Year of death missing
Athletes (track and field) at the 1932 Summer Olympics
Japanese female sprinters
Olympic athletes of Japan
Olympic female sprinters